Da Möb is a Swedish adult animated series, created by Magnus Carlsson, about three youths who form a rap band called Da Möb. They go on misadventures to try to get a record deal; however, they are unsuccessful, untalented and they are fighting a losing battle to make it in the music business. It aired in the USA from 2001 to 2002 and in Sweden from 2002 to 2003.

The name Da Mob comes from The Mob with a joke heavy metal umlaut

Voice Actors 
 Jamie Kennedy - Rooster
 Stuart Stone - JT
 Magnus Uggla - Tom
 Tara Strong - Tara Byron, Rooster's sister
 Neil Ross - Mr. Byron, Rooster's father
 Stephen Fry - Maurice, Mr Byron's butler
 Dame Lee - Tupac Shakur, he appears to Rooster in visions through his bathroom mirror
 Phil LaMarr - Sir Hamster Booty, a local rapper
 Ken Steele - Clive Shuman, a person of power

Additional Voices 
 Adam Lawson - Tara Byron's boyfriend
 Iona Morris - Wanda, a reporter
 Amy Lyndon - Additional Voices
 Natasha Slayton - Twins, Additional Voices
 Diane Michelle - Joyce
 Kelli Garner - Melanie Spores
 Kip King - Additional Voices
 James Arnold Taylor - Additional Voices
 Andre Sogliuzzo - Additional Voices
 Glenn Shadix - Additional Voices
 Tamara Phillips - Additional Voices
 Scott Torrence - Additional Voices
 Melanie Deane Moore - Additional Voices
 Samaria Graham - Additional Voices
 Valerie Pappas - Additional Voices
 Iggy Pop - Himself

References

External links

2000s Swedish television series
2000s adult animated television series
2000s animated comedy television series
2001 Swedish television series debuts
2002 Swedish television series endings
Animated musical television series
Fictional musical groups
Fictional rappers
Swedish animated television series
Television series by 20th Century Fox Television